Brainardsville is a hamlet in Franklin County, New York, United States. Brainardsville has a post office with ZIP code 12915.

References

 Hamlets in Franklin County, New York
 Hamlets in New York (state)